Leandro Hassum Moreira (born September 26, 1973), better known as Leandro Hassum, is a Brazilian actor, comedian, writer, and film producer. He is well known for having played Jorginho in the TV Show humorous Zorra Total and Os Caras de Pau.

Career
In 2012 he starred in the franchise Até que a Sorte nos Separe us that reached 320,000 box office in its first weekend of exhibition and became the best opening of a national film of that year gaining two more sequels.

Filmography

Television

Film

Dubbing

Theatre
 2009: Um Casal Aberto, Ma Non Troppo
 2008-atualmente: Lente de Aumento
 2006-2007: Nós no Tempo
 2006: O Livro Secreto
 2004–present: Nós na Fita
 2004: Orlando Silva, O Cantor Das Multidões
 2003 e 2008: Os Sem-Vergonhas
 2003: Mercedes de Medelin
 2001: Aracy de Almeida no País da Araca
 2001: Plunct Plact Zuuum
 2001: Descontrole Remoto
 2001: Dia dos Namorados
 2001: Tudo no Escuro
 2000-2004: Festa na Floresta
 2000: Toda Donzela Tem Um Pai Que É Uma Fera
 2000: Francisco de Assis
 2000: Deus É Gordo
 1999: Endependência
 1995: Pluft, o Fantasminha
 1995: Arca de Noé
 1994: Dois Fernandos e Um Fernandes
 1990: A Aurora da Minha Vida

Awards and nominations

References

External links

1973 births
Living people
Actors from Rio de Janeiro (state)
Brazilian male comedians
Brazilian male film actors
Brazilian male stage actors
Brazilian male television actors
Brazilian male voice actors
Brazilian male writers
Brazilian people of Arab descent
People from Niterói
20th-century Brazilian male actors
21st-century Brazilian male actors